Warsaw Bridge is a 1990 feature film by Pere Portabella. It was written by Portabella and his frequent collaborator 
Carles Santos, who also wrote the score. It was Portabella's first film since 1977, and his first to be photographed entirely in color.

External links
 

1990 films
Catalan-language films
1990s Spanish-language films
Spanish independent films
Films directed by Pere Portabella
1990s Spanish films